The Minister of Foreign Affairs was a government minister in charge of the Ministry of Foreign Affairs of South Vietnam (common name for the State of Vietnam and the Republic of Vietnam), in what is now southern region of Vietnam. The Minister was responsible for conducting foreign relations of the country.

List of ministers
The following is a list of foreign ministers of South Vietnam from 1949 until the fall of Saigon in 1975:

See also
Minister of Foreign Affairs (Vietnam)

References

 
South Vietnam
South Vietnam
South Vietnam